= Breeze Liu =

1. REDIRECT Draft:Breeze Liu
